Too Hype is the second studio album released by Tanya Stephens on November 25, 1997 on the 
VP Records/Madhouse Records label. The album is notable as it contains the "Yu Nuh Ready fi Dis Yet" track from the 1997 Reggae Gold album.

Track listing

References

1997 albums
Tanya Stephens albums